Paolo Herbert (born 1895, date of death unknown) was an Italian bobsledder. He competed in the four-man event at the 1924 Winter Olympics.

References

1895 births
Year of death missing
Italian male bobsledders
Olympic bobsledders of Italy
Bobsledders at the 1924 Winter Olympics
Place of birth missing